Ruisui Township is a rural township located in southern Hualien County, Taiwan, and has a population of 10,941 inhabitants in 11 villages.

The population is composed of Hoklo, Hakka, and Taiwanese aborigines, most of whom are Amis. Agriculture and tourism are major industries.

History
During Qing rule, the headquarters of Taitung Prefecture was located in modern-day Ruisui, known then as Tsui-be, or Tsui-boe. This written form was retained after the Kuomintang takeover of Taiwan in 1945; the characters are pronounced Sūi-sūi and Ruìsuì in Taiwanese and Mandarin Chinese, respectively.

Geography
The township lies in an alluvial plain which located midway up the Huadong Valley between the Central Mountain Range, Coastal Mountain Range and Wuhe Terrace. Rafting activity on the Xiuguluan River often starts from the Ruisui Bridge.

The climate is between tropical and subtropical monsoon with a humid climate.

The Tropic of Cancer passes through the township.

Administrative divisions
The township comprises 11 villages: Fumin, Fuxing, Fuyuan, Hegang, Jimei, Ruibei, Ruiliang, Ruimei, Ruisui, Ruixiang and Wuhe.

Tourist attractions

 Fuyuan National Forest Recreation Area
 Rareseed Ranch
 Ruisui Tropic of Cancer Marker
 Saoba Stone Pillars
Ruisui Hotspring
Honyeh Hotspring (Red Leaf Hotspring)
Wuhe Terrace Tea Plantations 
Ruisui Rafting Tourist Center (Xiuguluan River Rafting)
Ruisui Range
 Fuyuan Bao'an Temple
 Fuyuan Butterfly Village
 Maliyun Tribal Village
 Ruisui Qinglian Temple

Transportation

Taiwan Railway Administration stations on the Hualien–Taitung Line in Ruisui include:
 Fuyuan Station
 Ruisui Station

Highways in Ruisui include:
Provincial Highway 9, a north-south route through the Huadong Valley
, a parallel route crisscrossing the Xiugulan River

Sister cities
 Misato, Akita, Japan (friendship city)

Notable natives
 T.H. Tung, businessperson

References

Bibliography

External links

Office of Ruisui Township 

Townships in Hualien County